Out of Sight is a 1966 comedy film with elements of the spy spoof. It is the third and last of a series of films geared at teenagers by director Lennie Weinrib and producer Bart Patton for Universal Pictures.

Perhaps inspired by the success of the American International Pictures' teenage films, as well as Weinrib and Patton's Beach Party knockoff, Beach Ball, Universal and MCA signed a contract in 1965 for the pair to make 14 rock 'n' roll films in a two-year period; however, the only ones produced were Wild Wild Winter and this film. The title of the film was originally announced as Thunder Blunder a parody of Thunderball.

Plot
Homer (Jonathan Daly) is a butler to secret agent John Stamp. Overhearing a plot to disrupt a concert, Sandra Carter (Karen Jensen) contacts Stamp to seek his assistance but with his boss away, Homer steps into the role of superspy to save Rock and Roll from the criminal organisation known as F.L.U.S.H. FLUSH sends three femme fatale assassins after Sandra and Homer: Scuba (Wende Wagner), Tuff Bod (Deanna Lund) and Wipe Out (Maggie Thrett).

Production notes

Cast & crew
Out of Sight features a variety of Universal contract players, musical performances by Gary Lewis and the Playboys, Dobie Gray, Freddie and the Dreamers, The Astronauts, The Turtles and The Knickerbockers provided by music producer Nick Venet, and gadget-laden motor vehicles designed by George Barris. The film's spytime score was composed by Fred Darian (who then managed Dobie Gray) and Al DeLory.

The film was written by Larry Hovis, a comedian who was then co-starring in Hogan's Heroes.

This movie is the only onscreen appearance of The Turtles in a feature film.

John Lodge, who plays John Stamp, never reveals his face onscreen.

Although Bob Eubanks is listed in the opening credits, he does not appear onscreen at all - only his voice is heard as the announcer at the concert.

Weinrib's directing career consists of only three feature films - all in the beach party genre: Beach Ball for Paramount in 1965, and Wild Wild Winter and Out of Sight, both for Universal in 1966.

The Astronauts were a Boulder, Colorado-based surf band who had a Billboard Top 100 hit in 1963 with their song “Baja,” and appeared in more beach party movies than any other surf band. These films were Wild Wild Winter, Surf Party, and Wild on the Beach.

Exterior locations

Announced in production in November 1965, Out of Sight was filmed in two weeks with exterior sequences done at Zuma Beach.

The futuristic-looking residence of John Stamp and his butler, Homer, is actually the Lautner-designed “Garcia Residence” on Mulholland Drive in the Hollywood Hills, built in 1962.

The building and plaza that Stamp and Homer trespass to plant a bomb is the 1963 Ralph Vaughn-designed MCA Tower (aka “The Black Tower” - now named the Lew R. Wasserman Building) on Lankershim Boulevard in Universal City.

Vehicles

[West Hollywood, California] auto customizer George Barris was given four weeks to supply vehicles for the film that was made from a left over Munster Koach fiberglass body. The top was removed, the rear engine was moved back in the square tube frame, then the second  engine was placed in front of the rear engine. The body after finished altering it, was channeled over frame. The body was cut after the first doors, then the rear section of the body was moved forward. They cut out the middle doors from the Munster Koach body, They then slid the whole rear the body forward and epoxied it. After this was done; both the small third doors and the front doors; were removed. Then they were epoxied together and the inside was reinforced with plywood. Then foam rubber was added to cover over the plywood. Next they upholstered in  gold flake star Naugahyde on the doors and spare tire carriers. The top in back is just side pieces, so a lid had to go over them to get the side pieces to fit. The middle of the top is used for two purposes; 1).to pull off to eject a person; like it happened with Jonathan Daily in Out of Sight to land in the side car of a Flush motorcycle. 2). When this steel top was put on in the middle; it served as a hardtop. A beautiful headdress of gold fringes; came off two inches from the front windshield. The rectangular lid was boxed on the sides. It was in this steel lid; that this golden headdress with fringes; on both left and right sides; also two inches off both sides; like the windshield. The windshield frame was angled forward, with another frame to meet the top of windshield frame to make an open triangle. The car was called "The ZZR" that was equipped with a variety of weapons in the manner of James Bond's customized Aston Martin DB-5 in Goldfinger. The front scoop was higher because it had a Cadillac air cleaner underneath it. Bias tires mounted on 11" Rader Star Mags front, which he still need, the peoples help, in obtaining  sizes 15", since we already, have Firestone tires to fit these, after we buy the tires. and Rader one ribbed in the rear. Mick Thompson dirt tires were fifteen inches wide in rear. A Cal-Custom kick channeled is mounted on rectangular tube frame with dual radiators. The brass custom grill cost $1,000 to make. The French Cibie headlights are mounted vertically between the fenders in specially designed nose with headlight shell, painted House of Kolor Kandy Dark Purple to match the rear fenders. The rest of the body is House of Kolor Pagan Gold. A complete arsenal in the rear trunk area is stocked with handguns, tear gas, hand grenades, telescopic machine gun, tar squirter, feather blow gun, and “skid juice” spray nozzle. Rear fenders house flame throwers, bullets never shot from the gun barrels inserted in the front tear drop front fenders. A model kit of the ZZR was made by AMT. Dox of Dox Art Factory in Italy owns the copyrights and both the original AMT drafting blueprints and Barris Kustoms The ZZR. The ZZR is going to be restored after 50 years; then make a European Circuit; then shown on the USA Circuit of car shows before returning to Italy.

Barris also provided a Yamaha motorcycle with sidecar and mortar for FLUSH. More information can be found at http://www.barris.com/

Archive footage

The footage of the screaming crowd during the two performances by Freddie & The Dreamers is actually a crowd watching a live performance of the Beatles in 1964, from the documentary, What's Happening! The Beatles in the U.S.A.

Movie tie-ins

Decca Records released the film soundtrack LP with Venet's instrumental theme released on a 45 rpm.

AMT manufactured a model kit of the ZZR dragster.

European release

The Italian title of the film was 007 agente per forza contro gli assassini dello yé yé .

Music
Fred Darian and Al DeLory composed the music score for the film, Nick Venet produced the instrumental Mariachi-trumpet-accented theme song.

Dobie Gray sings the title song, "(Out of Sight) Out on the Floor" (written by Fred Darian and Al De Lory).

Gary Lewis & The Playboys perform "Malibu Run" (written by Jimmy Karstein, Leon Russell, Gary Lewis and T. Leslie).

The Knickerbockers perform “It's Not Unusual” (written by Gordon Mills and Les Reed).

The Astronauts perform “Baby, Please Don't Go" (written by Big Joe Williams).

The Turtles perform "She'll Come Back" (written by Nita Garfield and Howard Kaylan).

Freddie & The Dreamers perform two songs: "Funny Over You" (written by Freddie Garrity) and "A Love Like You" (written by Quinn & Jones).

See also
List of American films of 1966

References

External links 
 

1966 films
American auto racing films
American musical comedy films
American spy comedy films
American teen comedy films
Beach party films
1966 musical comedy films
1960s spy comedy films
Universal Pictures films
1960s English-language films
1960s American films